The Yau Ma Tei Fruit Market, officially Yau Ma Tei Wholesale Fruit Market, also simply known as the Fruit Market, is a wholesale fruit market in Yau Ma Tei, Kowloon, Hong Kong.

Etymology
It is known as gwo laan in Cantonese. gwo means fruit while laan means wholesale market, derived from railing and enclosed area.

History
The market was founded in 1913 between Ferry Street, Waterloo Road and Reclamation Street with Shek Lung Street passing through it. The name of the market was originally Government Vegetables Market which sold fruit and vegetables. Fish traders joined in the 1930s. With the opening of Cheung Sha Wan Vegetables Wholesaling Market and Cheung Sha Wan Fishery Wholesaling Market in Cheung Sha Wan in 1965, the vegetables and fish stalls moved out. From then on the market has operated as a specialist fruit wholesaling market. The market was then officially known as Kowloon Wholesale Fruit Market until the name was transferred to Cheung Sha Wan Wholesale Market Complex in 1990.

Features
The market is a historically valuable site and is classified as a Grade II Historic Building since 2009. It consists of several blocks of one or two storey brick and stone buildings. Pre-World War II signboards are on the outer walls of the buildings.

Another historical building, Yau Ma Tei Theatre is adjacent to the market, across Reclamation Street.

Market operation
Many wholesalers still operate in the market. The busiest hours are 4 to 6 o'clock in the morning. Lorries and carts deliver boxes of fruit in and out of the market.

Transportation
 Yau Ma Tei station Exit B2
 KMB Route 10 and Citybus Route 20

In popular culture
Yau Ma Tei Fruit Market is used as a backdrop for 2018 TVB drama series Apple-Colada.

References

Further reading
 

Yau Ma Tei
Retail markets in Hong Kong
Grade II historic buildings in Hong Kong
Food markets in China
Wholesale markets in China